The Tularosa Basin is a graben basin in the Basin and Range Province and within the Chihuahuan Desert, east of the Rio Grande in southern New Mexico and West Texas, in the Southwestern United States.

Geography
The Tularosa Basin is located primarily in Otero County. It lies between the Sacramento Mountains to the east, and the San Andres and Oscura Mountains to the west. It is geologically considered part of the Rio Grande Rift zone, which widens there due to the slight clockwise rotation of the Colorado Plateau tectonic plate.

Notable features of the basin include White Sands National Park, Oliver Lee Memorial State Park, the Carrizozo Malpais lava flow, Holloman Air Force Base, and the White Sands Missile Range with the historic Trinity nuclear test Site. Tularosa Creek flows westward into the Tularosa Basin just north of the village of Tularosa. The distinct northwestern New Mexico Tularosa River is located in Catron County.

Hydrologically, the Tularosa Basin is an endorheic basin, as no water flows out of it.  The basin is closed to the north by Chupadera Mesa and to the south by the broad flat 4000-foot-elevation plain between the Franklin and Hueco Mountains, with the conventional boundary taken to be the New Mexico–Texas border.  Surface water that does not evaporate or soak into the ground eventually accumulates at playas (intermittently dry lake beds), the largest of which is Lake Lucero, at 3888 feet elevation, at the southwest end of the White Sands dunes. The White Sands are a 710-km2 (275-mi2) field of white sand dunes composed of gypsum crystals. To the north of Lake Lucero are extensive alkali flats, which produce additional gypsum for wind deposition on the dunes.

History 
Apache, Spanish, and U.S. 'Old West'
When the Spanish arrived in the Tularosa Basin, they found springs and small streams coming from the Sacramento Mountains that fed a relatively lush grassland on the eastern side of the basin.  While the Spanish tried some sheep ranching and some mining, the area remained firmly under Apache control until the 1850s, when the United States established its military presence at Fort Stanton (in the Sacramento Mountains) (1855–1896), Torreon Fort (near Lincoln) (1850s), and Camp Comfort (1858–1859) at White Sands.  Under US military protection, the first permanent settlement was established in 1862, when about 50 Hispanic farmers from the Rio Grande Valley moved to Tularosa. Efforts to control the Apache waned somewhat during the American Civil War and serious American settlement did not begin until the late 1870s, when settlers and cattle ranchers from Texas began moving into the basin.  In 1969, the Gemsbok was introduced.

Grasslands and grazing
The native grasslands in the Tularosa Basin were able to support large herds in the wet years of the 1880s. When the Americans first started running cattle, in some places, the native perennial bunchgrasses grew 'as high as a horse’s shoulder' -  depending on species.  One cowboy estimated in 1889 that 85,000 head were mustered within the basin, but said that was “far too heavy a burden for the range” - or beyond its carrying capacity. Severe drought followed for years, and the grassland pastures never recovered from the overgrazing, which continued in many instances for 75 years or more and caused top-soil erosion and desertification. Even within the White Sands Missile Range, where cattle grazing was eliminated in 1945, the effects from the 1890 -1945 period of overgrazing can still be seen nearly everywhere. Many areas that were historically known to be rich perennial grasslands are now xeric desert shrublands, with creosote bush—(Larrea tridentata) predominating.

Groundwater salinization
Since surface water was unable to sustain the cattle herds, ranchers turned to groundwater, and the easily reachable aquifer of 'sweet water' was pumped out and depleted from under the basin, leaving only brackish water.  Applying the groundwater to the surface resulted in additional salts being dissolved and transported back down by groundwater recharge into the aquifer, increasing its salinity. By 2000, it became clear that salts in the aquifer needed to be significantly reduced if existing levels of water use were to continue. Therefore, in 2004, the Tularosa Basin National Desalination Research Facility was established in the basin at Alamogordo, as a joint project of the Federal Bureau of Reclamation and Sandia National Laboratories. It is a national center for researching procedures to reduce brackish water creation and to develop new technologies for desalination as it is increasingly found in present-day inland basin aquifers with agricultural irrigation and potable water withdrawal demands.

Ecology 
The Tularosa Basin is in the Chihuahuan Desert ecoregion, with the former Great Plains grassland habitat ecotones. Because of the closed nature of the basin, a number of unique ecological niches have developed. A significant number of endemic species are only found in the Tularosa Basin.  These include the White Sands pupfish (Cyprinodon tularosa) and the Oscura Mountains chipmunk.

Counties
While the Tularosa Basin lies primarily in New Mexican Otero County, it also extends into Doña Ana, Sierra, Lincoln, and Socorro Counties in New Mexico, and El Paso County in southwest Texas.

Cities, towns, and ghost towns 
Alamogordo 
Alvarado 
Boles Acres 
Carrizozo 
Coane
Desert 
Elwood 
Estey City
Holloman AFB  ZIP Code: 88330
Kearney 
La Luz  ZIP Code: 88337
Lovelace 
Monista 
Omlee 
Orogrande  ZIP Code: 88342
Oscura
Point of Sands
Polly
Salinas
Three Rivers  ZIP Code: 88352
Tularosa  ZIP Code: 88352
Turquoise 
Valmont 
White Sands

Notes

External links
Alamogordo Museum: "Tularosa Basin Historical Society" website
NPS: official White Sands National Park website
City of Alamogordo website
Town of Carrizozo website
U.S. Army: White Sands Missile Range website

 
Endorheic basins of the United States
Landforms of New Mexico
Natural history of New Mexico
Regions of New Mexico
Valleys of New Mexico
Landforms of Otero County, New Mexico
Landforms of Doña Ana County, New Mexico
Landforms of Lincoln County, New Mexico
Landforms of Sierra County, New Mexico
Landforms of Socorro County, New Mexico
Landforms of El Paso County, Texas
Basin and Range Province
Structural basins of the United States
Valleys of Texas